The Kafufu or Kavu is a river of southwestern Tanzania. It flows through the Rukwa Valley, flowing between Lake Chada and emptying into Lake Rukwa. The river is deep and has a rapid flow. The Kafufu valley has significant reserves of iron and coal.

References

Rivers of Tanzania